Palisades was an American rock band from Iselin, New Jersey. Formed in 2008 as Marilyn Is Dead, they changed their name to Palisades in August 2011 and signed to Rise Records. Palisades has released five studio albums; Outcasts in 2012, Mind Games in 2015, a self-titled album in 2017, Erase the Pain in 2018, and their most recent Reaching Hypercritical on 22 July 2022. They also have one self-released album under their previous name.

History
The band formed in January 2008 as Marilyn Is Dead and self-released one album, Appearance Disappear, in 2009. Subsequently, the band saw two lineup changes, with bassist Chris Aleixo being replaced by Brandon Sidney in 2010 and vocalist Alex Farkas being replaced by Louis Miceli in 2011. This change in vocalist also came with a change of the band name to Palisades in August that year, and the self-release of their first EP, The Rise. The EP and its singles - "Immortal", "Bury It" and "Disclosure" (featuring Tyler Smith of The Word Alive) - gained Palisades the attention of Rise Records, who signed them later that year. Rise Records chose to re-release the EP in February 2012 under the new title, I'm Not Dying Today, while the band began work on a full-length debut album. After touring and working on the album throughout 2012, the band released Outcasts in May 2013. To promote the album, they released a single titled "Outcasts", and toured with Capture The Crown, Heartist, and Famous Last Words. Outcasts debuted at #181 on the Billboard top 200 chart. The band continued to release songs into 2014, including their cover of Beyoncé's hit single "Drunk in Love". 

On May 28, 2014, the band announced that they would be heading to the studio to begin work on their second album. Vocalist Lou Miceli released a statement regarding the overall sound of the band's second album stating: "We’re so excited to finally be in the studio recording our second album. We have grown so much since our last album and may have really established a sound that is truly just PALISADES. We feel like we are able to capture the energy of our live shows and put it into an actual recording this time around. We are not holding anything back and can’t wait to make our mark with this sophomore release."

On February 13, 2016, Palisades revealed that members Brandon Reese and Earl Halasan had quit the band to pursue other endeavors, and that Brandon Elgar would be the new bass player and second vocalist, and DJ/Producer Christian Mochizuki known as GRAVES would be the band's new DJ/ studio member. The band had expressed that both new members were better fits personally and had the musicianship to drive the band's new sound to a stronger presence.

In 2016, Palisades covered the My Chemical Romance song "House of Wolves" for a Rock Sound tribute CD.

Palisades released their self-titled studio album on January 20, 2017 via Rise Records. The band stated in multiple interviews that the sound for Palisades on the album is "kind of definitive".

In 2017, the ensemble toured with American hard rock band Letters from the Fire.

In 2018, the ensemble toured once again with American hard rock ensemble Letters from the Fire. On October 5, 2018, they released the single "War" from their new album Erase the Pain, and toured with Dayseeker and Savage Hands in support of it. Erase the Pain was released on December 28, 2018. The band toured with Nothing More, Of Mice & Men and Badflower in February 2019.

On December 1, 2021, Palisades announced the departure of Lou Miceli Jr, and that Brandon Elgar would become the band's lead vocalist going forward. On December 6, 2021, the band released "My Consequences", their first single with Elgar as the sole lead vocalist. On March 11, 2022, the band released the single "Better", and announced their fifth album, Reaching Hypercritical, which was released on July 22, 2022.

On October 27, 2022, the band announced via their Twitter account that vocalist Brandon Elgar had chosen to leave the band, leading them to withdraw from their upcoming tour with Secrets. On January 11, 2023, the band officially confirmed that they will break up after one last show, scheduled on February 25, 2023. They also announced that they would be joined by former vocalist Lou Miceli and keyboardist Earl Halasan for this show.

Band members
Final lineup
 Louis "Lou" Miceli Jr – lead vocals (2011–2021, 2023)
 Xavier Adames – lead guitar, backing vocals (2008–2023)
 Matthew Marshall – rhythm guitar (2008–2023)
 Aaron Rosa – drums, percussion (2008–2023)
 Earl Halasan – turntables, sampling, keyboards, synthesizers, programming (2008–2016, 2023), lead and rhythm guitar (2008–2013)

Session musicians
 Christian "Graves" Mochizuki – turntables, sampling, keyboards, synthesizers, programming (2016–2022)

Former members
 Alex Farkas  co-lead vocals (2008–2011)
 Chris Aleixo – bass, backing vocals (2008–2010)
 Brandon Reese – bass, backing vocals, co-lead vocals (2010–2016)
 Brandon Elgar – bass (2016–2022); co-lead vocals (2016–2021), lead vocals (2021-2022)

Timeline

Discography

Studio albums

EP
 I'm Not Dying Today (2012)

Singles

Compilation appearances

Music videos
 "Bury It" (2012)
 "Disclosure" (2012)
 "Outcasts" featuring Andy Leo from Crown the Empire (2013)
 "High and Low" featuring Tyler Carter of Issues (2014)
 "Mind Games" featuring Champs (2014)
 "No Chaser" (2015)
 "Fall" (2016)
 "Let Down" (2017)
 "Better Chemicals" (2017)
 "Through Hell" (2018)
 "War" (2018)
 "Erase The Pain" (2019)
 "My Consequences" (2021)
 "Better" (2022)
 "Sober" (2022)

Tours

References

Notes 

1.As Marilyn is Dead.

American post-hardcore musical groups
Electronicore musical groups
Musical groups established in 2008
Musical groups disestablished in 2023
2008 establishments in New Jersey
2023 disestablishments in New Jersey
Musical groups from New Jersey
Rise Records artists
Metalcore musical groups from New Jersey